The Eritrean Premier League is the highest division in football in Eritrea. The league was delivered in 1994 to the first time.

Between 1953 and the Eritrean independence in 1993, Eritrean teams played in the Ethiopian Premier League, winning that league's championship 9 times.

Previous champions 

 1994: not known
 1995: Red Sea FC (Asmara)
 1996: Adulis Club (Asmara)
 1997: FC Al Tahrir (Asmara)
 1998: Red Sea FC (Asmara)
 1999: Red Sea FC (Asmara)
 2000: Red Sea FC (Asmara)
 2001: Hintsa FC (Asmara)
 2002: Red Sea FC (Asmara)
 2003: Anseba S.C. (Keren)
 2004: Adulis Club (Asmara)
 2005: Red Sea FC (Asmara)
 2006: Adulis Club (Asmara)
 2007: FC Al Tahrir (Asmara)
 2008: Asmara Brewery
 2009: Red Sea FC (Asmara)
 2010: Red Sea FC (Asmara)
 2011: Red Sea FC (Asmara)
 2012: Red Sea FC (Asmara)
 2013: Red Sea FC (Asmara)
 2014: Red Sea FC (Asmara)
 2015–18: not known
 2019: Red Sea FC (Asmara)

Performance by club

External links 
Football for the Peoples. Eritrea
RSSSF competition history

Eritrean Premier League
Football leagues in Eritrea
Eritrea